The Orchestra Giovanile Italiana (OGI, Italian Youth Orchestra) is the national youth orchestra of Italy. It was founded in 1984 by Piero Farulli at the Fiesole School of Music.

Conductors that have worked with the OGI include Claudio Abbado, Roberto Abbado, Salvatore Accardo, Yuri Ahronovitch, Piero Bellugi, Luciano Berio, Andrey Boreyko, Daniele Gatti, Carlo Maria Giulini, Eliahu Inbal, Zubin Mehta, Riccardo Muti, Gianandrea Noseda, Krzysztof Penderecki, Giuseppe Sinopoli and Jeffrey Tate.

It is a member of the European Federation of National Youth Orchestras.

See also 
 List of youth orchestras

References 

Music education organizations
National youth orchestras
Italian orchestras
European youth orchestras
Musical groups established in 1984